The Brisbane Lions' 2006 season was its tenth season in the Australian Football League (AFL).

2005 off-season list changes

Ins

National draft

Pre-season draft

Rookie draft

Outs

Retirements and delistings

Season summary

Premiership Season

Home and away season

Round 1

Round 2

Round 3

Round 4

Round 5

Round 6

Round 7

Round 8

Round 9

Round 10

Round 11

Round 12

Round 13

Round 14

Round 15

Round 16

Round 17

Round 18

Round 19

Round 20

Round 21

Round 22

Ladder

References

Brisbane Lions Season, 2006
Brisbane Lions seasons